Frank Gatson Jr. is an American director and choreographer.

He is the creative director for En Vogue, Brandy, Kelly Rowland, Muni Long, Jussie Smollett, Rihanna, Jennifer Lopez and Beyoncé, a position he has held since her tenure with Destiny's Child. He has also choreographed videos, routines and live performances for other artists including R. Kelly, Michael Jackson, TLC, En Vogue, Kelly Rowland, Rihanna, Jennifer Lopez, Fifth Harmony, Destiny's Child, Little Mix, Toni Braxton and Usher.  Additionally, he served as choreographer for Disney's animated film Hercules, providing choreography for The Muses.

In 2016, he hosted BET's Chasing Destiny alongside Kelly Rowland. The pair formed a R&B girl group June's Diary who he now manages. Frank Gatson Jr. was manager for Luke James and Tyrese Gibson.

Early career
Gatson graduated from the University of Wisconsin-Madison in 1980 and began dancing for Up With People, an organization that travelled the globe performing at all various kinds of venues even appearing at several Super Bowl halftime performances. Eventually, he worked his way up to official 'dance captain' and began to manage the show itself. He later moved to
New York to study at the 'Broadway Dance Center' and 'Alvin Ailey Dance Center'. After finishing his time at Ailey and Broadway Centers he returned to the University of Wisconsin-Milwaukee and received a Masters in Theatre and Dance. He got his first professional break when he danced in Michael Jackson's "Smooth Criminal" video in 1986.

Work with En Vogue

Music videos

Work with R. Kelly

Music videos

Tours and live performances
 Down Low Top Secret Tour (1996) (as director and choreographer)
 39th Annual Grammy Awards (1998) (as choreographer) 
 Get Up On a Room Tour (1999) (as director and choreographer)
 Usher Raymond w/ Puffy “No Way Out Tour” (1998) (as director and choreographer)
 TP-2.COM Tour (2001) (as choreographer) 
 2005 MTV VMA's (2005) (as choreographer) 
 2013 Beyonce's Super Bowl XLVII Halftime show (as creative director and choreographer) 
 2015 Soul Train Awards (2015) (as choreographer) 
 The Buffet Tour (2016) (as director and choreographer)

Work with Beyoncé

Music videos

Tours and live performances
 The Beyoncé Experience (2007) (as show director, creative director and choreographer)
 I Am... World Tour (2009) (as director, creative director and choreographer)
 The Mrs. Carter Show World Tour (2013) (as director, creative director and choreographer)

Commercials
 True Star (2004)
 Samsung (2007)
 Armani Diamonds (2007)
 American Express (2007)
 L'Oreal (2007) 
 L'Oreal (2003) (with Jennifer Lopez)
 Stella Rosa (2022) Brandy  Brandy Norwood

Source:

Work with Usher

Music videos

Tours and live performances
 Share My World Tour (1997) (creative director)
 No Way Out Tour (1997) (as choreographer)
 8701 Promo Tour (2001) (creative director)
 One Night, One Star: Usher Live Showtime Special w/ Beyoncé (2005) (as choreographer)

References

FRANK GATSON Jr. - Bio, Chokolate
Choreographer returns home to celebrate Jackson, North Division, Journal Sentinel, 26 February 2010

External links

American choreographers
Beyoncé
Artists from Milwaukee
People from St. Landry Parish, Louisiana
University of Wisconsin–Madison alumni
University of Wisconsin–Milwaukee alumni
Living people
Year of birth missing (living people)